Hajjiabad (also Romanized as Ḩājjīābād) is a village in Zeberkhan Rural District, Central District, Zeberkhan County, Razavi Khorasan Province, Iran. At the 2016 census, its population was 1,637, in 509 families.

References 

Populated places in Nishapur County